Uncial 0155 (in the Gregory-Aland numbering), ε 1055 (von Soden), is a Greek uncial manuscript of the New Testament, dated palaeographically to the 9th century. 

The codex contains two small parts of the Gospel of Luke 3:1-2,5,7-11; 6:24-31, on two parchment leaves (27 cm by 20 cm). It is written in two columns per page, 22 lines per page, in uncial letters. 

The Greek text of this codex is a representative of the Alexandrian text-type. Aland placed it in Category II. 

It is dated by the Institute for New Testament Textual Research to the 9th century.

The codex used to be held in Qubbat al-Khazna in Damascus (without catalogue number). The location of the codex is unknown. The manuscript is not accessible.

See also 

 List of New Testament uncials
 Textual criticism

References 

Greek New Testament uncials
9th-century biblical manuscripts
Lost biblical manuscripts